The Smith and Weller Building, also known as the Knights of Pythias Hall, was a historic building located in New London, Iowa, United States. Charles W. Smith and C.B. Weller bought the lot on which the building sat for $300 in 1872. The building itself was built sometime before 1879 when Smith and Weller sold the lot to Sam Keiser and W.S. Workman for $2,500. The structure was designed in the Italianate style and featured simple brick-patterned arches. Keiser and his wife owned the building until 1907 when they sold it to the Knights of Pythias for their lodge. A hardware store occupied the main floor and the lodge was on the second floor. The Knights of Pythias sold the building in 1946 to Otis and Mae Maginnis. The building housed a bar in the intervening years. It was listed on the National Register of Historic Places in 2003, and it was delisted in 2020. The building was demolished in 2020.

References

New London, Iowa
Italianate architecture in Iowa
Buildings and structures in Henry County, Iowa
National Register of Historic Places in Henry County, Iowa
Commercial buildings on the National Register of Historic Places in Iowa
Buildings and structures demolished in 2020
Demolished buildings and structures in Iowa